Spear grass or speargrass is the common name of numerous herbaceous plants worldwide including:

Poaceae (grasses)
Aristida spp.
Heteropogon contortus
Imperata cylindrica
Piptochaetium
Poa spp.
Stipa spp.; typically Stipa calamagrostis

Apiaceae (umbellifers)
Aciphylla spp.

Other
Foxtail (disambiguation)